A list of British films released in 1925.

1925

See also
 1925 in film
 1925 in the United Kingdom

References

External links
 

1925
Films
Lists of 1925 films by country or language
1920s in British cinema